Bahlul Hoseini (born 1961) is an Iranian politician.

Hoseini was born in Meyaneh. He is a member of the 7th and 9th Islamic Consultative Assembly from the electorate of Meyaneh with Mohammad Ali Madadi. Hoseini won with 25,848 (29.40%) votes.

References

External links
 Hoseini Website

People from Mianeh
Deputies of Mianeh
Living people
1961 births
Members of the 9th Islamic Consultative Assembly
Members of the 7th Islamic Consultative Assembly